Nobuhle Majika (born 9 May 1991) is a Zimbabwean association football defender who plays for the Zimbabwe women's national football team.
In 2016, she represented her country in their Olympic debut at the 2016 Summer Olympics in Brazil.

Personal life
She has two brothers George and Moses who also play football. Early in her career she was supported by former footballer Peter Ndlovu who gave her advice and football boots. She is from Bulawayo.

References

External links

 

Sportspeople from Bulawayo
Zimbabwe women's international footballers
Footballers at the 2016 Summer Olympics
Olympic footballers of Zimbabwe
Living people
1991 births
Zimbabwean women's footballers
Women's association football defenders